|}

The Sprint Cup is a Group 1 flat horse race in Great Britain open to thoroughbreds aged three years or older. It is run at Haydock Park over a distance of 6 furlongs (1,207 metres), and it is scheduled to take place each year in early September.

History
The event was established in 1966, and it was originally open to horses aged two or older. It was devised by Robert Sangster, the heir to the Vernons Pools business, who later became a leading racehorse owner/breeder. During the early part of its history the race was sponsored by Vernons and held in early November. It was initially contested on a course with a sharp left-hand bend.

The Vernons Sprint Cup was switched to September in 1979. It was transferred to Haydock's newly installed 6-furlong straight track in 1986. It was promoted to Group 1 status in 1988, the final year of Vernons' sponsorship. For a period the race was closed to two-year-olds, but it reopened in 1989. Juveniles were excluded again from 1994.

The Sprint Cup is currently sponsored by Betfair.

Records
Most successful horse (2 wins):
 Be Friendly – 1966, 1967

Leading jockey (3 wins):
 Lester Piggott – Green God (1971), Abergwaun (1972), Moorestyle (1980)
 Pat Eddery – Record Token (1976), Dowsing (1988), Danehill (1989)
 Willie Carson – Boldboy (1977), Habibti (1983), Dayjur (1990)
 Bruce Raymond – Runnett (1981), Petong (1984), Sheikh Albadou (1992)

Leading trainer (4 wins):
 John Dunlop – Runnett (1981), Habibti (1983), Lavinia Fontana (1994), Invincible Spirit (2002)

Leading owner (4 wins):
 Sheikh Mohammed – Ajdal (1987), Wolfhound (1993), Cherokee Rose (1995), Goodricke (2005)

Winners

See also
 Horse racing in Great Britain
 List of British flat horse races

References

 Racing Post:

 galopp-sieger.de – Sprint Cup.
 horseracingintfed.com – International Federation of Horseracing Authorities – Sprint Cup (2018).
 pedigreequery.com – Sprint Cup – Haydock.
 

Flat races in Great Britain
Haydock Park Racecourse
Open sprint category horse races
Recurring sporting events established in 1966
British Champions Series
1966 establishments in England